"Noi vogliam Dio, Vergin Maria" is a Marian hymn from the Italian folk tradition. It is a translation of the French hymn "Nous voulons Dieu", written and composed for a pilgrimage to Lourdes on 11 September 1882 by François-Xavier Moreau, parish priest of Sorigny. The music and lyrics were published into a booklet whose fourth edition was issued in 1885.

The melody later became well known as a liturgical melody after it lost its civil and religious significance and remains a song with strong lines to the Pope and his period as a secular ruler—it is still used as a liturgical chant, especially in processions.

Lyrics

Noi vogliam Dio, Vergin Maria,
benigna ascolta il nostro dir,
noi t’invochiamo, o Madre pia,
dei figli tuoi compi il desir.

Chorus: Deh benedici, o Madre, al grido della fe’,
noi vogliam Dio, ch’è nostro Padre,
noi vogliam Dio, ch’è nostro Re.
noi vogliam Dio, ch’è nostro Padre,
noi vogliam Dio, ch’è nostro Re.

Noi vogliam Dio nelle famiglie 
dei nostri cari in mezzo al cor; 
sian puri i figli, caste le figlie, 
tutti c’infiammi di Dio l’amor.

Noi vogliam Dio in ogni scuola
perché la cara gioventù
la legge apprenda e la parola
della sapienza di Gesù.

Chorus: Deh benedici, o Madre...’,

Noi vogliam Dio nell’officina
perché sia santo anche il lavor;
a Lui dal campo la fronte china
alzi fidente l’agricoltor.

Chorus: Deh benedici, o Madre...’,

Noi vogliam Dio nella coscienza
di chi l’Italia governerà!
Così la patria riavrà potenza
e a nuova vita risorgerà.

Chorus: Deh benedici, o Madre...’,

Noi vogliam Dio, dell’alma è il grido,
che a piè leviamo del santo altar.
Grido d’amore ardente e fido,
per tua man possa al ciel volar.

Chorus: Deh benedici, o Madre...’,

Noi vogliam Dio, l’inique genti
contro di lui si sollevar.
E negli eccessi loro furenti
osaron stolti Iddio sfidar.

Chorus: Deh benedici, o Madre...’,

Noi vogliam Dio, Dio nella scuola,
vogliam che in essa la gioventù
studi la santa di lui la Parola,
miri l’ immagine del buon Gesù.

Chorus: Deh benedici, o Madre...’,

Noi vogliam Dio, nel giudicare
a Dio s’ispiri il tribunal.
Dio nelle nozze innanzi all’altare,
Dio del morente al capezzal.

Chorus: Deh benedici, o Madre...’,

Noi vogliam Dio, perché al soldato
coraggio infonda nel guerreggiar,
sì che a difesa del suo amato
d’ Italia sappia da eroe pugnar.

Chorus: Deh benedici, o Madre...’,

Noi vogliam Dio, quest’ almo grido
echeggi ovunque in terra e in mar,
suoni solenne in ogni lido,
dove s’ innalza di Dio l’ altar.

Chorus: Deh benedici, o Madre...’,

Noi vogliam Dio, le inique genti
rigettan stolte il suo regnar,
ma noi un patto stringiam fidenti,
ne fia chi osi più Iddio sfidar.

Chorus: Deh benedici, o Madre...’,

Noi vogliam Dio, nei tribunali
egli presieda al giudicar.
Noi lo vogliamo negli sponsali,
nostro conforto allo spirar.

Chorus: Deh benedici, o Madre...’,

References

External links
Video of Noi Vogliam Dio played by a band in a procession
Video featuring the vocal anthem

Historical national anthems
Papal States
Marian hymns
Italian folk songs
Italian anthems
European anthems
National anthem compositions in E major
National anthem compositions in F major